Gibault Catholic High School is a private, Roman Catholic high school in Waterloo, Illinois.  It is part of the Roman Catholic Diocese of Belleville.

History
Gibault Catholic High School was established in 1946 as SS Peter and Paul School. It was given its current name in 1966.

Athletics

In 2023, the Boys Basketball team won its first state championship, defeating Scales Mound for the Class 1A State Title.

In 2013, the Boys Baseball team won its first state championship, defeating Putnam County for the Class 1A State Title.

Gibault won three consecutive state championships in soccer between 2005 and 2007.

Notable alumni
John Rheinecker - MLB baseball

References

External links
 

Educational institutions established in 1946
Roman Catholic Diocese of Belleville
Catholic secondary schools in Illinois
Waterloo, Illinois
Education in the Metro East
Schools in Monroe County, Illinois
1946 establishments in Illinois